Route 190 is a -long east–west secondary highway in western New Brunswick, Canada.

The route's western terminus is at the Canada/US Border between Carlingford, New Brunswick and Fort Fairfield, Maine. Route 190 travels east to the town of Perth-Andover where it ends at Route 130. In Perth-Andover, the route is called Fort Road.

History

The road from Andover to the border near Fort Fairfield, Maine was originally designated as Route 7. It was renumbered as Route 19 in 1965 and Route 190 in 1984.

A high-speed connector road between the Trans-Canada Highway and the bridge in Perth-Andover was constructed as part of upgrades to the Trans Canada Highway in 2003. It became part of Route 109, which was extended from across the river, while Route 190 was shortened.

See also
List of New Brunswick provincial highways

References

190
190